{{DISPLAYTITLE:C18H21NO3}}
The molecular formula C18H21NO3 (molar mass : 299.36 g/mol) may refer to:

 Codeine
 Erythravine
 Heterocodeine
 Hydrocodone
 Isocodeine
 Metopon

Molecular formulas